The 1899–1900 Scottish Division Two was won by Partick Thistle with Linthouse finishing bottom.

Table

References

Scottish Football Archive

Scottish Division Two seasons
2